Vazha Khutsishvili (born 27 June 1993) is a Georgian rugby union player who plays at scrum-half for Rustavi Kharebi in the Georgia Championship and the Georgia national team. He was named in the Georgian squad for the 2015 Rugby World Cup.

References

1993 births
Living people
Rugby union players from Georgia (country)
People from Rustavi
Georgia international rugby union players
Rugby union scrum-halves